The 2020–21 Washington Wizards season was the 60th season of the franchise in the National Basketball Association (NBA) and 48th in the Washington, D.C. area.

This was the first season since 2009–10 without long-time point guard and former first-overall draft pick John Wall on the roster, as he was traded to the Houston Rockets for Russell Westbrook on December 2, 2020. The trade reunited Westbrook with Wizards head coach Scott Brooks, who was Westbrook's coach from 2008–2015, when he played for the Oklahoma City Thunder.

The Wizards qualified for the playoffs for the first time since the 2017–18 season following a victory over the Indiana Pacers in the Play-in Tournament. They lost to the top seeded Philadelphia 76ers in five games in the first round.

Following the season, Scott Brooks and the Wizards agreed to part ways after not being able to agree to a new contract.

Draft picks

With their natural selection at #9, the Wizards drafted the Israeli forward Deni Avdija. It was the first time in NBA history an Israeli had been drafted in the Top 10. With the second-round pick they acquired from the Chicago Bulls in a trade last year, the Wizards drafted the Czech guard Vít Krejčí. Later that night, the team proposed to trade Krejčí to the Oklahoma City Thunder for the rights to their #53 pick, Cassius Winston, and a future second-round pick. The trade was finalized the next day, with the rights to Krejčí and Admiral Schofield going to the Thunder in exchange for Winston and the Thunder's second-round pick (via the Memphis Grizzlies) in the 2024 NBA draft.

Roster

Standings

Division

Conference

Notes
 z – Clinched home court advantage for the entire playoffs
 c – Clinched home court advantage for the conference playoffs
 y – Clinched division title
 x – Clinched playoff spot
 pb – Clinched play-in spot
 o – Eliminated from playoff contention
 * – Division leader

Game log

Regular season 

|-style="background:#fcc;"
| 1
| December 23
| @ Philadelphia
| 107–113
| Bradley Beal (31)
| Russell Westbrook (11)
| Russell Westbrook (15)
| Wells Fargo Center (0)
| 0–1
|-style="background:#fcc;"
| 2
| December 26
| Orlando
| 120–130
| Bradley Beal (39)
| Russell Westbrook (15)
| Russell Westbrook (12)
| Capital One Arena (0)
| 0–2
|-style="background:#fcc;"
| 3
| December 27
| Orlando
| 113–120
| Bradley Beal (29)
| Deni Avdija (9)
| Bradley Beal (7)
| Capital One Arena (0)
| 0–3
|-style="background:#fcc;"
| 4
| December 29
| Chicago
| 107–115
| Bradley Beal (29)
| Russell Westbrook (15)
| Russell Westbrook (11)
| Capital One Arena (0)
| 0–4
|-style="background:#fcc;"
| 5
| December 31
| Chicago
| 130–133
| Beal, Bryant (29)
| Russell Westbrook (10)
| Russell Westbrook (11)
| Capital One Arena (0)
| 0–5

|-style="background:#cfc;"
| 6
| January 1
| @ Minnesota
| 130–109
| Bradley Beal (31)
| Thomas Bryant (7)
| Ish Smith (9)
| Target Center (0)
| 1–5
|-style="background:#cfc;"
| 7
| January 3
| @ Brooklyn
| 123–122
| Bradley Beal (27)
| Thomas Bryant (14)
| Russell Westbrook (10)
| Barclays Center (0)
| 2–5
|-style="background:#fcc;"
| 8
| January 6
| @ Philadelphia
| 136–141
| Bradley Beal (60)
| Russell Westbrook (8)
| Russell Westbrook (12)
| Wells Fargo Center (0)
| 2–6
|-style="background:#fcc;"
| 9
| January 8
| @ Boston
| 107–116
| Bradley Beal (41)
| Thomas Bryant (8)
| Russell Westbrook (8)
| TD Garden (0)
| 2–7
|-style="background:#fcc;"
| 10
| January 9
| Miami
| 124–128
| Garrison Mathews (22)
| Moritz Wagner (7)
| Ish Smith (7)
| Capital One Arena (0)
| 2–8
|-style="background:#cfc;"
| 11
| January 11
| Phoenix
| 128–107
| Bradley Beal (34)
| Robin Lopez (11)
| Bradley Beal (9)
| Capital One Arena (0)
| 3–8
|-style="background:lightgrey;"
| 
| January 13
| Utah
| colspan=6| Postponed (COVID-19) (Makeup date: March 18)
|-style="background:lightgrey;"
| 
| January 15
| @ Detroit
| colspan=6| Postponed (COVID-19) (Makeup date: April 1)
|-style="background:lightgrey;"
| 
| January 17
| Cleveland
| colspan=6| Postponed (COVID-19) (Makeup date: April 25)
|-style="background:lightgrey;"
| 
| January 18
| Cleveland
| colspan=6| Postponed (COVID-19) (Makeup date: May 14) 
|-style="background:lightgrey;"
| 
| January 20
| @ Charlotte
| colspan=6| Postponed (COVID-19) (Makeup date: February 7)  
|-style="background:lightgrey;"
| 
| January 22
| @ Milwaukee
| colspan=6| Postponed (COVID-19) (Makeup date: May 5)
|-style="background:#fcc;"
| 12
| January 24
| @ San Antonio
| 101–121
| Bradley Beal (31)
| Russell Westbrook (8)
| Russell Westbrook (6)
| AT&T Center (0)
| 3–9
|-style="background:#fcc;"
| 13
| January 26
| @ Houston
| 88–107
| Bradley Beal (33)
| Russell Westbrook (11)
| Russell Westbrook (7)
| Toyota Center (0)
| 3–10
|-style="background:#fcc;"
| 14
| January 27
| @ New Orleans
| 106–124
| Bradley Beal (47)
| Jordan Bell (11)
| Bradley Beal (6)
| Smoothie King Center (0)
| 3–11
|-style="background:#fcc;"
| 15
| January 29
| Atlanta
| 100–116
| Beal, Westbrook (26)
| Alex Len (9)
| Russell Westbrook (4)
| Capital One Arena (0)
| 3–12
|-style="background:#cfc;"
| 16
| January 31
| Brooklyn
| 149–146
| Russell Westbrook (41)
| Russell Westbrook (10)
| Russell Westbrook (8)
| Capital One Arena (0)
| 4–12

|-style="background:#fcc;"
| 17
| February 2
| Portland
| 121–132
| Bradley Beal (37)
| Russell Westbrook (12)
| Russell Westbrook (10)
| Capital One Arena (0)
| 4–13
|-style="background:#cfc;"
| 18
| February 3
| @ Miami
| 103–100
| Bradley Beal (32)
| Rui Hachimura (9)
| Ish Smith (6)
| American Airlines Arena (0)
| 5–13
|-style="background:#fcc;"
| 19
| February 5
| @ Miami
| 95–122
| Alex Len (18)
| Robin Lopez (7)
| Ish Smith (5)
| American Airlines Arena (0)
| 5–14
|-style="background:#fcc;"
| 20
| February 7
| @ Charlotte
| 97–119
| Bradley Beal (31)
| Russell Westbrook (11)
| Russell Westbrook (9)
| Spectrum Center (0)
| 5–15
|-style="background:#cfc;"
| 21
| February 8
| @ Chicago
| 105–101
| Bradley Beal (35)
| Avdija, Hachimura (10)
| Beal, Smith (7)
| United Center (0)
| 6–15
|-style="background:#fcc;"
| 22
| February 10
| Toronto
| 115–137
| Bradley Beal (24)
| Avdija, Hachimura (7)
| Russell Westbrook (7)
| Capital One Arena (0)
| 6–16
|-style="background:#fcc;"
| 23
| February 12
| New York
| 91–109
| Russell Westbrook (23)
| Russell Westbrook (9)
| Russell Westbrook (10)
| Capital One Arena (0)
| 6–17
|-style="background:#cfc;"
| 24
| February 14
| Boston
| 104–91
| Bradley Beal (35)
| Deni Avdija (10)
| Russell Westbrook (11)
| Capital One Arena (0)
| 7–17
|-style="background:#cfc;"
| 25
| February 15
| Houston
| 131–119
| Bradley Beal (37)
| Russell Westbrook (13)
| Russell Westbrook (15)
| Capital One Arena (0)
| 8–17
|-style="background:#cfc;"
| 26
| February 17
| Denver
| 130–128
| Dāvis Bertāns (35)
| Russell Westbrook (13)
| Russell Westbrook (12)
| Capital One Arena (0)
| 9–17
|-style="background:#cfc;"
| 27
| February 20
| @ Portland
| 118–111
| Bradley Beal (37)
| Russell Westbrook (11)
| Russell Westbrook (13)
| Moda Center (0)
| 10–17
|-style="background:#cfc;"
| 28
| February 22
| @ L. A. Lakers
| 127–124 (OT)
| Bradley Beal (37)
| Russell Westbrook (14)
| Russell Westbrook (9)
| Staples Center (0)
| 11–17
|-style="background:#fcc;"
| 29
| February 23
| @ L. A. Clippers
| 116–135
| Bradley Beal (28)
| Russell Westbrook (9)
| Bradley Beal (10)
| Staples Center (0)
| 11–18
|-style="background:#cfc;"
| 30
| February 25
| @ Denver
| 112–110
| Bradley Beal (33)
| Russell Westbrook (10)
| Russell Westbrook (10)
| Ball Arena (0)
| 12–18
|-style="background:#cfc;"
| 31
| February 27
| @ Minnesota
| 128–112
| Bradley Beal (34)
| Russell Westbrook (14)
| Russell Westbrook (12)
| Capital One Arena (0)
| 13–18
|-style="background:#fcc;"
| 32
| February 28
| @ Boston
| 110–111
| Bradley Beal (46)
| Russell Westbrook (11)
| Russell Westbrook (4)
| TD Garden (0)
| 13–19

|-style="background:#fcc;"
| 33
| March 2
| Memphis
| 111–125
| Beal, Westbrook (23)
| Avdija, Len (7)
| Russell Westbrook (15)
| Capital One Arena (0)
| 13–20
|-style="background:#cfc;"
| 34
| March 4
| L. A. Clippers
| 119–117
| Bradley Beal (33)
| Russell Westbrook (9)
| Russell Westbrook (11)
| Capital One Arena (0)
| 14–20
|-style="background:#fcc;"
| 35
| March 10
| @ Memphis
| 112–127
| Bradley Beal (21)
| Avdija, Hachimura, Lopez (6)
| Russell Westbrook (10)
| FedExForum (1,912)
| 14–21
|-style="background:#fcc;"
| 36
| March 12
| Philadelphia
| 105–127
| Russell Westbrook (25)
| Avdija, Lopez, Westbrook (5)
| Russell Westbrook (8)
| Capital One Arena (0)
| 14–22
|-style="background:#fcc;"
| 37
| March 13
| Milwaukee
| 119–125
| Rui Hachimura (29)
| Rui Hachimura (11)
| Russell Westbrook (12)
| Capital One Arena (0)
| 14–23
|-style="background:#fcc;"
| 38
| March 15
| Milwaukee
| 122–133
| Bradley Beal (37)
| Rui Hachimura (7)
| Russell Westbrook (17)
| Capital One Arena (0)
| 14–24
|-style="background:#fcc;"
| 39
| March 17
| Sacramento
| 119–121
| Bradley Beal (29)
| Russell Westbrook (14)
| Russell Westbrook (10)
| Capital One Arena (0)
| 14–25
|-style="background:#cfc;"
| 40
| March 18
| Utah
| 131–122
| Bradley Beal (43)
| Russell Westbrook (15)
| Russell Westbrook (13)
| Capital One Arena (0)
| 15–25
|-style="background:#fcc;"
| 41
| March 21
| @ Brooklyn
| 106–113
| Russell Westbrook (29)
| Russell Westbrook (13)
| Russell Westbrook (13)
| Barclays Center (0)
| 15–26
|-style="background:#fcc;"
| 42
| March 23
| @ New York
| 113–131
| Bradley Beal (22)
| Rui Hachimura (7)
| Russell Westbrook (12)
| Madison Square Garden (1,589)
| 15–27
|-style="background:#fcc;"
| 43
| March 25
| @ New York
| 102–106
| Bradley Beal (26)
| Russell Westbrook (18)
| Beal, Westbrook (9)
| Madison Square Garden (1,817)
| 15–28
|-style="background:#cfc;"
| 44
| March 27
| Detroit
| 106–92
| Russell Westbrook (19)
| Russell Westbrook (19)
| Russell Westbrook (10)
| Capital One Arena (0)
| 16–28
|-style="background:#cfc;"
| 45
| March 29
| Indiana
| 132–124
| Russell Westbrook (35)
| Russell Westbrook (14)
| Russell Westbrook (21)
| Capital One Arena (0)
| 17–28
|-style="background:#fcc;"
| 46
| March 30
| Charlotte
| 104–114
| Rui Hachimura (30)
| Russell Westbrook (15)
| Russell Westbrook (14)
| Capital One Arena (0)
| 17–29

|-style="background:#fcc;"
| 47
| April 1
| @ Detroit
| 91–120
| Lopez, Westbrook (16)
| Russell Westbrook (11)
| Russell Westbrook (12)
| Little Caesars Arena (750)
| 17–30
|-style="background:#fcc;"
| 48
| April 3
| Dallas
| 87–109
| Russell Westbrook (26)
| Russell Westbrook (14)
| Russell Westbrook (5)
| Capital One Arena (0)
| 17–31
|-style="background:#fcc;"
| 49
| April 5
| @ Toronto
| 101–103
| Russell Westbrook (23)
| Russell Westbrook (14)
| Russell Westbrook (11)
| Amalie Arena (1,620)
| 17–32
|-style="background:#cfc;"
| 50
| April 7
| Orlando
| 116–113
| Bradley Beal (26)
| Russell Westbrook (14)
| Russell Westbrook (15)
| Amway Center (3,991)
| 18–32
|-style="background:#cfc;"
| 51
| April 9
| @ Golden State
| 110–107
| Bradley Beal (20)
| Russell Westbrook (14)
| Russell Westbrook (14)
| Chase Center (0)
| 19–32
|-style="background:#fcc;"
| 52
| April 10
| @ Phoenix
| 106–134
| Raul Neto (24)
| Russell Westbrook (11)
| Russell Westbrook (14)
| Phoenix Suns Arena (5,028)
| 19–33
|-style="background:#cfc;"
| 53
| April 12
| @ Utah
| 125–121
| Bradley Beal (34)
| Russell Westbrook (14)
| Russell Westbrook (14)
| Vivint Arena (5,546)
| 20–33
|-style="background:#cfc;"
| 54
| April 14
| @ Sacramento
| 123–111
| Bradley Beal (31)
| Russell Westbrook (15)
| Russell Westbrook (11)
| Golden 1 Center (0)
| 21–33
|-style="background:#cfc;"
| 55
| April 16
| New Orleans
| 117–115 (OT)
| Bradley Beal (30)
| Russell Westbrook (15)
| Russell Westbrook (9)
| Capital One Arena (0)
| 22–33
|-style="background:#cfc;"
| 56
| April 17
| Detroit
| 121–100
| Bradley Beal (37)
| Russell Westbrook (14)
| Russell Westbrook (11)
| Capital One Arena (0)
| 23–33
|-style="background:#cfc;"
| 57
| April 19
| Oklahoma City
| 119–107
| Bradley Beal (30)
| Russell Westbrook (11)
| Russell Westbrook (17)
| Capital One Arena (0)
| 24–33
|-style="background:#cfc;"
| 58
| April 21
| Golden State
| 118–114
| Bradley Beal (29)
| Russell Westbrook (20)
| Russell Westbrook (10)
| Capital One Arena (2,133)
| 25–33
|-style="background:#cfc;"
| 59
| April 22
| @ Oklahoma City
| 129–109
| Russell Westbrook (37)
| Russell Westbrook (11)
| Russell Westbrook (11)
| Chesapeake Energy Arena (0)
| 26–33
|-style="background:#cfc;"
| 60
| April 25
| Cleveland
| 119–110
| Bradley Beal (33)
| Beal, Gafford (6)
| Russell Westbrook (11)
| Capital One Arena (2,133)
| 27–33
|-style="background:#fcc;"
| 61
| April 26
| San Antonio
| 143–146
| Bradley Beal (45)
| Russell Westbrook (13)
| Russell Westbrook (14)
| Capital One Arena (2,133)
| 27–34
|-style="background:#cfc;"
| 62
| April 28
| L. A. Lakers
| 116–107
| Bradley Beal (27)
| Russell Westbrook (18)
| Russell Westbrook (14)
| Capital One Arena (2,133)
| 28–34
|-style="background:#cfc;"
| 63
| April 30
| @ Cleveland
| 122–93
| Bradley Beal (19)
| Russell Westbrook (12)
| Russell Westbrook (11)
| Rocket Mortgage FieldHouse (4,148)
| 29–34

|-style="background:#fcc;"
| 64
| May 1
| @ Dallas
| 124–125
| Russell Westbrook (42)
| Russell Westbrook (10)
| Russell Westbrook (9)
| American Airlines Center (4,351)
| 29–35
|-style="background:#cfc;"
| 65
| May 3
| Indiana
| 154–141
| Rui Hachimura (27)
| Russell Westbrook (21)
| Russell Westbrook (24)
| Capital One Arena (2,133)
| 30–35
|-style="background:#fcc;"
| 66
| May 5
| @ Milwaukee
| 134–135
| Bradley Beal (42)
| Russell Westbrook (12)
| Russell Westbrook (17)
| Fiserv Forum (3,280)
| 30–36
|-style="background:#cfc;"
| 67
| May 6
| @ Toronto
| 131–129
| Bradley Beal (28)
| Russell Westbrook (17)
| Russell Westbrook (17)
| Amalie Arena (2,494)
| 31–36
|-style="background:#cfc;"
| 68
| May 8
| @ Indiana
| 133–132 (OT)
| Bradley Beal (50)
| Russell Westbrook (19)
| Russell Westbrook (15)
| Bankers Life Fieldhouse (0)
| 32–36
|-style="background:#fcc;"
| 69
| May 10
| @ Atlanta
| 124–125
| Russell Westbrook (28)
| Russell Westbrook (13)
| Russell Westbrook (21)
| State Farm Arena (3,054)
| 32–37
|-style="background:#fcc;"
| 70
| May 12
| @ Atlanta
| 116–120
| Russell Westbrook (34)
| Alex Len (10)
| Russell Westbrook (15)
| State Farm Arena (3,120)
| 32–38
|-style="background:#cfc;"
| 71
| May 14
| Cleveland
| 120–105
| Russell Westbrook (21)
| Russell Westbrook (12)
| Russell Westbrook (17)
| Capital One Arena (5,333)
| 33–38
|-style="background:#cfc;"
| 72
| May 16
| Charlotte
| 115–110
| Bradley Beal (25)
| Russell Westbrook (15)
| Russell Westbrook (10)
| Capital One Arena (5,333)
| 34–38

Play-in 

|-style="background:#fcc;"
| 1
| May 18
| @ Boston
| 
| Bradley Beal (22)
| Russell Westbrook (14)
| Bradley Beal (6)
| TD Garden (4,789)
| 0–1
|-style="background:#cfc;"
| 2
| May 20
| Indiana
| 
| Bradley Beal (25)
| Daniel Gafford (13)
| Russell Westbrook (15)
| Capital One Arena (0)
| 1–1

Playoffs 

|-style="background:#fcc;"
| 1
| May 23
| @ Philadelphia
| 
| Bradley Beal (33)
| Bradley Beal (10)
| Russell Westbrook (14)
| Wells Fargo Center (11,160)
| 0–1
|-style="background:#fcc;"
| 2
| May 26
| @ Philadelphia
| 
| Bradley Beal (33)
| Rui Hachimura (7)
| Russell Westbrook (11)
| Wells Fargo Center (11,160)
| 0–2
|-style="background:#fcc;"
| 3
| May 29
| Philadelphia
| 
| Russell Westbrook (26)
| Russell Westbrook (12)
| Russell Westbrook (10)
| Capital One Arena (10,665)
| 0–3
|-style="background:#cfc;"
| 4
| May 31
| Philadelphia
| 
| Bradley Beal (27)
| Russell Westbrook (21)
| Russell Westbrook (14)
| Capital One Arena (10,665)
| 1–3
|-style="background:#fcc;"
| 5
| June 2
| @ Philadelphia
| 
| Bradley Beal (32)
| Russell Westbrook (8)
| Russell Westbrook (10)
| Wells Fargo Center (15,523)
| 1–4

Transactions

Trades

Re-signed

Additions

Subtractions

References

2020-21
2020–21 NBA season by team
2020 in sports in Washington, D.C.
2021 in sports in Washington, D.C.